Rodrigo Nestor Bertalia (born 9 August 2000) is a Brazilian professional footballer who plays for Vasco  as a midfielder.

Career statistics

Notes

Honours
São Paulo
Campeonato Paulista: 2021

References

2000 births
Living people
Brazilian footballers
Brazil youth international footballers
Association football midfielders
Campeonato Brasileiro Série A players
São Paulo FC players
Footballers from São Paulo